"Back to You" is a song by English recording artist Mollie King. It was co-written by King alongside Rob Persaud and the production duo The Blueprint (Ryan Ogren and Nick Bailey), and was released as a digital download on 19 August 2016 by Island Records, followed by a remix EP a week later.

Background and release
"Back to You" was King's debut solo single, following the hiatus of girl group The Saturdays. The song was rumoured to be about King's "former on/off relationship" with model David Gandy. The music video was filmed by director Lisa Gunning.

"Back to You" debuted and peaked at number 90 on the UK Singles Chart, and at number 38 on the sales-only chart. It has sold over 15,000 copies in the UK to date. It reached the top 20 of the iTunes chart upon release, and in March 2021, returned to the iTunes top 40 following a campaign on the internet music forum BuzzJack for the site's 15th anniversary.

Track listings
Digital download
"Back to You" – 2:59

Digital "Pt. 2" EP
"Back to You" (Acoustic) – 3:28
"Back to You" (LuvBug Remix) – 3:50
"Back to You" (Rooftop Boys Remix) – 3:44
"Back to You" (The Weekenders Remix) – 3:19

Charts

Weekly charts

References

2016 songs
2016 singles
Songs written by Ryan Ogren
Songs written by Rob Persaud